Samsi railway station is a station on the Howrah–New Jalpaiguri line in Malda district of West Bengal, India. It is situated in North East Frontier Zone in Katihar railway division of India.

Trains
Major Trains available from this railway station are as follows:
 Delhi Junction - Kamakhya Brahmaputra Mail
Dibrugarh–Howrah Kamrup Express via Guwahati
Dibrugarh–Howrah Kamrup Express Via Rangapara North
 Sealdah–Silchar Kanchenjunga Express
 Sealdah–Agartala Kanchenjunga Express
 Sealdah-New Alipurdiar Teesta Torsha Express
 Sealdah Saharsha Hate Bazare Express
 Kolkata–Radhikapur Express
 Kolkata–Jogbani Express
 Howrah Katihar Express
 New Jalpaiguri -Malda Town Express
 Howrah Radhikapur Kulik Express
 Siliguri-Balurghat Express

References

Railway stations in Malda district